Iracema is a municipality located in the midwest of the state of Roraima in Brazil. Its population is 12,296 (2020) and its area is 14,413 km². Iracema started as an agricultural community. It became an independent municipality in 1994. The town is located on the BR-174 highway, and is known for its waterfall.

References

Municipalities in Roraima